Major General John Hedley Thornton Priestman,  (22 July 1885 – 22 February 1964) was a senior officer in the British Army.

Early life and family
John Hedley Thornton Priestman was born on 22 July 1885, the son of J. Priestman of East Mount, Holderness. In 1915, he married Hilda Louise (died 1958), daughter of J. H. Corner of Esk Hall in Sleights. They had two children, one son and one daughter; the son, John Reeve Thornton, was killed in action in North Africa in 1943, while commissioned as a lieutenant in the Army.

Military career
Priestman was commissioned into a volunteer unit, the 6th Battalion, the Manchester Regiment, on 12 March 1904 before he passed his examinations and was commissioned into the Lincolnshire Regiment as a second lieutenant on 29 November 1905. He was promoted to a lieutenant on 8 October 1910 and served as an Adjutant between November of that year and November 1913. He became a captain on 4 August 1914, an acting major on 11 September 1916, a brevet major on New Years Day 1919 and major on 5 June 1923.

Priestman served in the First World War, and was wounded on duty. Mentioned in Despatches three times during the war, he received the French Croix de guerre, the Distinguished Service Order in 1917, and the Military Cross. He served as Officer of a Company of Gentleman Cadets at the Royal Military College, Sandhurst from July 1914 to February 1916; that April, he was posted as a Staff Captain in France for two months, before being appointed as a brigade major until September. He returned to his previous post until January 1917, when he was again made a brigade major, this time serving until 20 July 1917. The following day, Priestman became a General staff Officer of the 2nd Division in France.

The war ended on 11 November 1918 due to the Armistice with Germany. From April 1919, Priestman was Commander of a Company of Gentleman Cadets at the Royal Military College and a General Staff Officer. Transferred to Aldershot as a GSO in 1922, he relinquished his post there in May 1924, after having attended the Staff College, Camberley from 1921 to 1922. The following November, he became DAAG Western Command but relinquished that position in January 1928. He was promoted to brevet lieutenant colonel in the meantime (28 June 1924). He attended the Imperial Defence College in 1929.

April 1932 saw Priestman appointed to be GSOA at the War Office. On 21 December 1934, he transferred to command the 13th Brigade in Northern Command, serving in Egypt, Palestine and Trans-Jordan as a temporary brigadier between 15 December 1934 and 13 September 1938, including during the Arab revolt in Palestine. His brigade major from December 1936 onwards was Manley James, a Victoria Cross recipient. He was promoted to the rank of major general on 27 December 1937, became an Aide-de-Camp to the King on 17 November 1937, serving for 10 months, and Colonel of the Lincolnshire Regiment on 3 June 1938. After relinquishing his appointment in the Middle East, he returned to the United Kingdom and became General Officer Commanding (GOC) of the 54th (East Anglian) Infantry Division in September 1938 and GOC of the Essex County Division in February 1941 before retiring October 1941.

Priestman was appointed a Commander of the Order of the British Empire in 1938 and a Companion of the Order of the Bath in 1939. He retired in 1941 and died on 22 February 1964 at his home in Hertford.

References

Bibliography

External links
Generals of World War II

1885 births
1964 deaths
British Army major generals
Academics of the Royal Military College, Sandhurst
Graduates of the Royal College of Defence Studies
British Army generals of World War II
British Army personnel of World War I
British military personnel of the 1936–1939 Arab revolt in Palestine
Commanders of the Order of the British Empire
Companions of the Distinguished Service Order
Companions of the Order of the Bath
Graduates of the Staff College, Camberley
Manchester Regiment officers
Recipients of the Croix de Guerre 1914–1918 (France)
Recipients of the Military Cross
Royal Lincolnshire Regiment officers
People from Hertford